Dustin Swinehart (born July 1, 1974, in Columbus, Ohio) is a former American soccer player. He spent virtually his entire professional career playing with the Charlotte Eagles. Swinehart was named the Director of Community Relations for Charlotte FC in January 2020.

Career

College
Swinehart grew up in Worthington, Ohio and played college soccer at Miami University from 1992 to 1995. He finished his college career with 32 career goals, a school record.

Professional
Swinehart professional career began in 1996 when he signed with the Hampton Road Mariners in the USISL.  1997 he played with the Indiana Blast.  In 1998, Swinehart signed with the Charlotte Eagles in the USISL, where he remained, with the exception of two brief loan periods with the Richmond Kickers in 2004 and 2005.

Swinehart was named the MVP of the 2000 USL Second Division championship game, and in 2001, after the Eagles moved up to the USL First Division, he was named to the USL-1 All League First Team. In 2004, after the Eagles returned to the USL Second Division, Swinehart considered retiring, but decided to continue with the team.  He was named to the USL-2 All League first team in 2005, 2006 and 2008, while in 2008 he was also named as the USL-2 MVP.

On March 10, 2010, Swineheart announced his retirement from professional soccer. He was six time First Team All-League, and was part of two National Championship squads with the Eagles. He finished his professional career with 135 goals.

Swinehart played the amateur team CASL Elite in the Lamar Hunt U.S. Open Cup in 2010; his team won their regional qualification group (which also featured NPSL teams FC Tulsa and Atlanta FC) before falling 4–2 to USL Second Division pro side Charleston Battery in the first round of tournament proper.

Swinehart current work for Charlotte Football Club of Major League Soccer as the Director of Community Engagement.

References

External links
Charlotte Eagles bio
September 2004 Interview

Living people
American soccer players
Charlotte Eagles players
Richmond Kickers players
USISL players
USL First Division players
USL Second Division players
1974 births
People from Worthington, Ohio
Miami RedHawks men's soccer players
Association football forwards
Soccer players from Columbus, Ohio